The 2019–20 NBL Uganda season was the 25th season of the National Basketball League of Uganda, organised by the FUBA. The season began on April 12, 2019, and ended on January 19, 2020.

The City Oilers won their seventh consecutive NBL title, after beating UCU Canons in the playoff finals. They qualified for the 2021 BAL qualification tournaments. Landry Ndikumana was the league MVP and top scorer James Okello was named Playoffs MVP.

Regular season 
The regular season began on March 11, 2022. All teams played each other twice, once home and once away.

Playoffs 
The playoffs were played between two teams in a best-of-seven series the UCU Canons and the City Oilers.

Bracket

Finals

References 

2018–19 in African basketball leagues
Basketball in Uganda